The Zheng clan of Xingyang was a prominent Chinese clan, chiefly based around Xingyang (modern day Kaifeng, Henan). Tracing their origins to the rulers of the State of Zheng, they became highly prominent in government during the Northern and Southern Dynasties, where they became one of the "Four Clans" in Northern Wei, and also during the Tang Dynasty.

History

The Zheng clan of Xingyang traces its descent to the fall of the State of Zheng to the State of Han in 375 BC.

Northern and Southern dynasties

The Zheng clan first became prominent in the Northern and Southern dynasties period as officials in Northern Wei, beginning with Zheng Xi (426–492). Throughout the period, they engaged in intermarriage with other major clans, as well as with the ruling Tuoba clan.

Alongside the Cui clan of Boling, the Lu clan of Fanyang and the Wang clan of Taiyuan, the Zhengs were one of the "Four Surnames" of Northern Wei.

Prominent Members

Zheng Congdang (d. 887), Tang chancellor
Zheng Lang (d. 857), Tang chancellor
Zheng Yuqing (746–820), Tang chancellor
Zheng Xunyu (738–805), Tang chancellor
Zheng Tan (d. 842), Tang chancellor
Zheng Yanchang (d. 894), Tang chancellor
Zheng Tian (825–883), Tang chancellor and military commander who defeated Huang Chao

References

 
Chinese clans